Chattogram Zila Krira Sangstha Swimming Complex is a modern indoor swimming complex in outer stadium in Kazir Dewri, Chattogram, Bangladesh.

Construction

On 12 October 2019, Chattogram City Corporation Mayor A J M Nasir Uddin announced that the facility would be  known as Sheikh Russell Swimming Complex.

References

2019 establishments in Bangladesh
Swimming pools
Swimming venues in Bangladesh
Sports in Bangladesh